Spyro is the titular main character and protagonist of the Spyro video game series, including The Legend of Spyro, and a guest character in the Skylanders series, first appearing in Spyro the Dragon in 1998.

Spyro is an energetic, young, male, purple dragon. He is known for his ability to defeat enemies by breathing fire and charging at them, and his ability to glide to otherwise unreachable areas in the game world. Spyro is often accompanied by his best friend Sparx, who is a dragonfly.

Spyro was designed and created by Charles Zembillas for Insomniac Games, the developers of the first three games in the series. The character has endured in popular culture as a mascot of the PlayStation video game console alongside Crash Bandicoot, having appeared in several games together with him. Both characters were owned by Universal Studios, under the former video game division Universal Interactive and have since become an intellectual property of Activision, through the merger between Vivendi Universal Games and Activision to create Activision Blizzard.

Development 
After developing Disruptor, Insomniac president, Ted Price, contacted Zembillas to design a playable dragon character for a video game. Zembillas had previously designed Crash for Naughty Dog, whose offices were just across the hall from Insomniac's at Universal Interactive Studios.

Spyro was originally named "Pete" and colored green during development, but the name was dropped to avoid infringing on the trademark Pete's Dragon, which was owned by The Walt Disney Company. His color was changed to purple so as to avoid blending in with any grassy areas. He was made younger to appeal to children, needing "to be cute, but at the same time, mischievous, bratty, unpredictable, and something of an upstart."

Spyro was given the ability to glide infinitely to give him "something he could do that no other platformer could", making the game's worlds significantly larger and providing more incentive for exploration. According to programmer Peter Hastings, NASA rocket scientist Matt Whiting was hired to program Spyro's controls so that he could move as smoothly as possible.

Price claimed in an interview that Insomniac stopped developing Spyro games after Spyro: Year of the Dragon because Spyro didn’t have hands and therefore his actions were limited.

Voice portrayal
Spyro was originally voiced by Carlos Alazraqui in Spyro the Dragon. Alazraqui explained in an interview with Electronic Gaming Monthly that he tried to make Spyro's voice sound like "a kid at camp that everybody likes."

He was later replaced by Tom Kenny, who has been voicing the character since 1999, beginning with Spyro 2: Ripto's Rage!. In later years, he was voiced by Jess Harnell in Spyro: A Hero's Tail; Elijah Wood in The Legend of Spyro series; Josh Keaton in Skylanders: Spyro's Adventure and Matthew Mercer in Skylanders: Imaginators;

In the television series Skylanders Academy, he was voiced by Justin Long and by Jason Ritter, who voiced Dark Spyro.

In the Japanese versions of the games, he was voiced by Akiko Yajima, Manabu Ino, and Masahito Kawanago

Characteristics

Personality and backstory 
Spyro originates from the Dragon Kingdom in Spyro the Dragon, and lives in the Artisans homeworld. He is very brash, being eager to defeat the game's villain, Gnasty Gnorc. In Spyro 2: Ripto's Rage! and Year of the Dragon, Spyro is more mature and laidback, though he continues to trash talk enemies such as Ripto.

In The Legend of Spyro, which takes place in a different continuity, Spyro was raised by dragonflies alongside Sparx after his egg was lost during an attempt to destroy his brood. He comes from a rare line of purple dragons, who are able to physically harness the power of the four classical elements. Here, Spyro is described as willing to help his friends and strangers with whatever problems they may have, without desire for reward. Spyro is adventurous, curious about his past, and eager to shape his future, in which he is expected to become something of a chieftain. Spyro also has an evil alter ego known as "Dark Spyro", who is stoic, ruthless, and animalistic, and manifests when Spyro is consumed by the "Dark Aether", a force born from negative energies.

In the Skylanders franchise, Spyro is described as strong-willed and young at heart, but has a headstrong and arrogant attitude. Much as in The Legend of Spyro, he comes from a rare line of purple dragons in a faraway land few have ever traveled, and his adventures and heroics were chronicled by the "Portal Masters of Old". He was eventually invited to join the Skylanders by Master Eon and now lives in Skylands, remaining as one of its most valued protectors. Spyro can also become Dark Spyro in Skylanders; this incarnation is in better control of himself and uses the darkness to fight evil, but is always at risk of being consumed by it.

Relationships 
Spyro and Sparx have been best friends ever since they were still in eggs. Sparx follows Spyro and acts as his health indicator, and helps him collect treasure scattered throughout the game world. If Sparx disappears, Spyro will be left vulnerable, but Spyro can replenish Sparx by finding butterflies for him to eat, which are usually acquired by attacking smaller animals such as sheep. Spyro generally respects the other dragons, but is impatient with more senior ones and often tries to leave as they are talking.

In Ripto's Rage!, Spyro meets Elora the Faun, Hunter the cheetah, and a mole known as the Professor, who assist him in various missions. A fairy named Zoe appears to help Spyro save his game progress. In Year of the Dragon, Spyro meets a rabbit sorceress named Bianca, whom he initially distrusts but later becomes his ally and Hunter's girlfriend. Spyro disapproves of their relationship calling it "a sad sight". In Year of the Dragon, Spyro meets Sheila the kangaroo, Sgt. Byrd the flying penguin, Bentley the Yeti, and Agent 9 the laser-wielding monkey, who appear as additional playable characters after Spyro frees them from captivity.

Spyro's most persistent enemy is Ripto, a tyrant who hates dragons. He also has a negative relationship with Moneybags, a bear whom he often has to pay treasure to for goods or services. In Year of the Dragon, Moneybags often suffers abuse at Spyro's behest and is attacked by him for trying to sell a stolen dragon egg. In Spyro: A Hero's Tail, a pink female dragon named Ember has a crush on Spyro, who is not interested.

In The Legend of Spyro, Spyro is Sparx's foster brother. An older "Dragon Guardian" named Ignitus acts as a sort of father figure to him. Spyro develops a strong bond with Cynder, a black female dragon who is at first his enemy but later becomes his love interest.

In the main Skylanders canon, Spyro is good friends with fellow Skylanders Gill Grunt and Trigger Happy, and acts as the Skylanders' leader whenever Master Eon is unavailable. In the Netflix series, Skylanders Academy, Spyro is best friends with Stealth Elf and Eruptor, two fellow cadets who became Skylanders along with him.

Abilities 
In most Spyro games, Spyro's main attacks consist of charging with his horns or breathing fire to defeat enemies and destroy treasure chests. Spyro can use his wings to glide, though he needs to utilize certain powerups to be able to fly freely. Spyro can also use powerups that allow him to charge at high speeds and enhance his fire breath, as well as breathe ice, jump to higher places, and become invincible.

In Ripto's Rage!, Spyro learns new abilities from Moneybags in exchange for treasure. These include the ability to swim underwater, where Spyro can charge at enemies, but can only blow bubbles instead of fire. He also learns to climb up certain walls using his claws, and a maneuver called the "headbash", wherein Spyro dives straight downward with his horns. Spyro retains these abilities in later games.

In Spyro: Enter the Dragonfly, in addition to his fire breath, Spyro can collect magic runes that allow him to breathe lightning, ice, and bubbles that he can use to catch lost baby dragonflies. In A Hero's Tail, Spyro rescues fairies that grant him the power to breathe lightning, water, and ice.

In The Legend of Spyro, Spyro can breathe and manipulate fire, ice, electricity, and earth. Once he learns to use all four elements, he can use a fifth energy-based element known as "Aether", which only purple dragons can use. In The Legend of Spyro: The Eternal Night, Spyro acquires the "Dragon Time" ability, which allows him to slow down time. Spyro can fly infinitely in The Legend of Spyro: Dawn of the Dragon, having become a teenager, and is also playable as Dark Spyro when consumed by Dark Aether.

In Skylanders, Spyro has the ability to control all of the elements of the world of Skylands but prefers to use fire. He can harness nearby darkness, allowing him to become Dark Spyro.

Appearances

Original continuity 
In Spyro the Dragon, Gnasty Gnorc traps all the dragons of the Dragon Kingdom in crystal except for Spyro, who avoids him with his smaller stature. Spyro sets to work saving the trapped dragons and collecting stolen treasure and dragon eggs, and finally vanquishes Gnasty after fighting off his other minions.

In Ripto's Rage!, Spyro and Sparx decide to take a vacation to Dragon Shores, a local beach. Instead they arrive in Avalar, where Hunter, Elora, and their friend the Professor need his help to defeat Ripto and his minions Crush and Gulp, who are trying to take over. After helping the inhabitants and acquiring magical talismans and orbs from them, Spyro defeats Ripto, Crush, and Gulp, and he and Sparx finally have their vacation.

In Year of the Dragon, Spyro, Sparx, and Hunter must retrieve a batch of dragon eggs, which Bianca and an army of "rhynocs" have stolen from them for the Sorceress, who rules over the Forgotten Realms and needs them to replenish their dying magic. Bianca discovers that the Sorceress actually plans to kill the baby dragons for a spell that will make her immortal, leading her to ally with Spyro. After defeating the Sorceress, Spyro returns to the Dragon Kingdom with the baby dragons.

In Enter the Dragonfly, Spyro must save the newborn baby dragonflies when Ripto and his Riptocs invade the Dragon Kingdom to abduct them.

In A Hero's Tail, Spyro must save the Dragon Kingdom from being plunged into darkness by Red, an evil sorcerer dragon.

In Spyro: Season of Ice, Spyro is on holiday when he has to save Zoe and the other fairies from Grendor the rhynoc, who has accidentally given himself two heads using a spell and needs their power to undo it.

In Spyro 2: Season of Flame, Spyro must rescue all the Dragon Kingdom's fireflies, without which he breathes ice instead of fire.

In Spyro: Attack of the Rhynocs, Spyro must defeat Ripto, who has stolen a warp device from the Professor.

In Spyro: Shadow Legacy, Spyro must learn an ancient martial art known as "dragon-kata" to save the Dragon Kingdom, Avalar, and the Forgotten Realms, which have been trapped in the mysterious Shadow Realm.

Spyro appears in Spyro Reignited Trilogy, a remastered compilation consisting of Spyro the Dragon, Ripto's Rage!, and Year of the Dragon.

The Legend of Spyro 
In The Legend of Spyro: A New Beginning, Spyro must battle Cynder when she has taken over the Dragon Temple in order to free her superior, the Dark Master. Spyro meets the four Dragon Guardians, who teach him to use the four elements, and finally defeats and frees Cynder from the Dark Master's influence, whereupon she joins his cause.

In The Eternal Night, the dragons are attacked by Gaul, the Ape King, who is trying to free the Dark Master using a lunar alignment known as the "Night of Eternal Darkness". Spyro travels to meet the Chronicler, who teaches him to use Dragon Time. Spyro confronts Gaul at the Mountain of Malefor to stop him and rescue Cynder, whom the Apes have kidnapped. The Night of Eternal Darkness occurs, causing Spyro to become Dark Spyro, destroying Gaul before Cynder returns him to normal. As the mountain crumbles, Spyro uses Dragon Time to trap himself, Sparx, and Cynder in a giant crystal, protecting them.

In Dawn of the Dragon, Spyro, Sparx, and Cynder emerge from the crystal. They meet Hunter, and learn that the Dark Master, Malefor, has returned. Malefor himself is a purple dragon like Spyro, but intends to cover the world in darkness and ultimately destroy it. Malefor nearly succeeds, but Spyro and Cynder confront and defeat him. Spyro seemingly sacrifices himself to repair Malefor's damage and Cynder chooses to die with him, telling him she loves him. Their fate is left ambiguous, but they are seen flying through the air together at the end of the game.

Skylanders 

Spyro appears in the Skylanders franchise, starting with its first installment, Skylanders: Spyro's Adventure. Hailing from a line of rare magical purple dragons, Spyro has been a devoted battler for good and embarked on many adventures. His heroism and exploits has been chronicled by the old Portal Masters and the Ancients until Master Eon finally reached out and invited Spyro to become of Skylands' most valued protectors. Consumers who bought a Spyro playable figure can play as him throughout the Skylanders console games.

Spyro acts as a guide for players within certain levels of Skylanders: Imaginators, alongside other popular fan-favorite Skylanders.

Other media 
Spyro appears in Spyro Orange: The Cortex Conspiracy and Crash Bandicoot Purple: Ripto's Rampage, where he meets Crash Bandicoot and teams up with him to defeat Ripto and Doctor Neo Cortex, who are trying to take over both of their worlds. Spyro also appears as an unlockable character in the Game Boy Advance version of Crash Nitro Kart, and makes cameo appearances in Crash Twinsanity and Astro's Playroom. Additionally, he makes a playable guest appearance in Crash Team Racing Nitro-Fueled as post-launch downloadable content.

Spyro appears briefly in a commercial for Ty the Tasmanian Tiger alongside Crash and Sonic the Hedgehog. All three are in full body casts in the hospital with boomerangs in their bodies, apparently having been put there by Ty.

Spyro also appears in novels and certain issues of the Skylanders comic book series by IDW Publishing; including his own mini comic series, Spyro & Friends. Furthermore, he is the main protagonist in the computer-animated streaming television series, Skylanders Academy.

Merchandise 
Handheld LCD games, themed after Spyro as well as Crash Bandicoot, were packaged in McDonald's Mighty Kids Meals in 2005 to promote A Hero's Tail and Crash Twinsanity. The Legend of Spyro-themed toys were packaged with Wendy's Kids' Meals in 2007 to promote The Eternal Night. Spyro has also appeared in Skylanders-themed plush toys and MEGA Bloks sets.

Spyro-themed figures were released in 2018 by First4Figures and Activision to promote Reignited Trilogy. Merchandise related to the Spyro franchise will be released by Numskulls alongside the game's launch.

Reception 
GameRevolution criticized Spyro's voice in Spyro the Dragon, comparing it negatively to the Taco Bell chihuahua, who was also voiced by Carlos Alazraqui. IGN praised Spyro's design, saying he is "cute but not sickeningly cute", later criticizing him as "just a little bland, and not the kind of mascot that I would ever fall in love with... he's kind of like a blend between a big puppy and a donkey, painted purple." UGO.com listed Spyro on their list of "The Cutest Video Game Characters", stating "The purple little guy was cute, but not cute enough to win the Great Playstation Mascot War of 1998." The 2011 Guinness World Records Gamer's Edition lists Spyro as the 39th most popular video game character. In 2012, GamesRadar ranked Spyro, "one of the most relatable mythological creatures of all time", as the 92nd "most memorable, influential, and badass" protagonist in games. In the same year, he was ranked 9th in Complex'''s "The 25 Most Kickass Dragons in Video Games" list, with writer Obi Anyawu stating Spyro "is truly an original just from his size and color alone." Ravi Sinha of GamingBolt named Spyro on his appearance at Skylanders as 2nd of their "Worst Video Game Character Design", stating that "Cute, innocent, fire-breathing Spyro didn’t deserve his terrible redesign. Beloved by many old-school PlayStation fans, Spyro was brought into Skylanders with much fanfare. His actual design seemed intended to make him more…dragon-like? Instead, it made Spyro look borderline frightening yet still goofy as opposed to, you know, a hero." HobbyConsolas'' also included Spyro on their "The 30 best heroes of the last 30 years."

References 

Action-adventure game characters
Activision characters
American mascots
Animal characters in video games
Animal superheroes
Anthropomorphic video game characters
Child characters in video games
Child superheroes
Dragon characters in video games
Dragon mascots
Fantasy video game characters
Japanese mascots
Male characters in advertising
Male characters in comics
Male characters in television
Male characters in video games
Male superheroes
Mascots introduced in 1998
Sony Interactive Entertainment protagonists
Spyro the Dragon
Toy mascots
Video game characters introduced in 1998
Video game characters with fire or heat abilities
Video game mascots
Video game superheroes
Universal Pictures cartoons and characters
First-person shooter characters